Les Bird was a Canadian ice hockey player.

Bird was a member of the Saskatoon Quakers who represented Canada at the 1934 World Ice Hockey Championships held in Milan, Italy where they won Gold.

See also
List of Canadian national ice hockey team rosters

References

External links

Canadian ice hockey left wingers
Saskatoon Quakers players